The men's 400 metres hurdles sprint competition of the athletics events at the 1979 Pan American Games took place at the Estadio Sixto Escobar. The defending Pan American Games champion was James King of the United States.

Records
Prior to this competition, the existing world and Pan American Games records were as follows:

Results

Heats

Final
Held on 8 July

References

Athletics at the 1979 Pan American Games
1979